Ding Shande (November 12, 1911 – December 8, 1995) was a Chinese composer, pianist, and music teacher.

Biography 
Ding was born in Kunshan, Jiangsu. He studied music with teachers including Huang Tzu at the Shanghai Conservatory of Music. Ding taught at the Shanghai Conservatory in the late 1930s. From 1947 to 1949, he studied composition in the Paris Conservatoire with Noël Gallon, Tony Aubin, and Nadia Boulanger. He also attended the courses of Arthur Honegger. From 1949, he taught at the Shanghai Conservatory again and became a vice president of the conservatory later. He died in Shanghai in 1995.

Ding's influential composition includes the Long March Symphony, symphonic suite New China, and the children's piano suite Happy Festival. He has also written theoretical works.

Renowned conductor Yu Long is Ding's grandson.

Works 
 Long March, symphony
 New China, symphonic suite
 Spring, symphonic Poem
 Symphonic Overture 
 Piano Concerto in B flat major
 String Quartet in E minor
 Piano Trio in C major
 Ode to the Huangpu River, cantata 
 Variations on Themes of Chinese Folk-songs, for piano
 Happy Festival, children's piano suite
 Xinjiang Dances Nos. 1 and 2, for piano
 Blue Mist, art song 
 My Husband Gives Me a Sunflower, art song
 Ode to Orange, art song

Discography (selection) 
 The Long March Symphony (abridged version) - Nagoya Philharmonic Orchestra, Lim Kek-Tjiang, Marco Polo HK-1004, 1978.
 The Long March Symphony - Hong Kong Philharmonic Orchestra, Yoshikazu Fukumura, Marco Polo HK 6.240187/88, 1984.
 The Long March Symphony - Slovak Radio Symphony Orchestra, Yu Long, Marco Polo 8.223579, 1994.
 The Long March Symphony - Russian Philharmonic Orchestra, Mak Ka-Lok, Hugo Records, 1995.
 The Long March Symphony - Shanghai Symphony Orchestra, Yu Long, Deutsche Grammophon 0289 483 6449 7, 2019.
 Piano Concerto in B-Flat, op.23 - Louis Lortie, Shanghai Symphony Orchestra, Wong Khachun, Classic [Streaming Only], 2018.
 Children's Suite - Chen Jie, Naxos 8.570602, 2007.
 Spring Suite [and other piano works] - Ding Jiannuo, Marco Polo 82083, 2000.
 Xinjiang Dances Nos. 1 & 2 - Slovak Radio Symphony Orchestra, Adrian Leaper, Marco Polo 8.223408, 1991.
 Variations on a Chinese Folk Theme - Shanghai Philharmonic Orchestra, Cao Peng, Marco Polo 8.223956, 1995.
 Variations on a Xinjiang Folk Tune - Shanghai Philharmonic Orchestra, Cao Peng, Marco Polo 8.223956, 1995.

References 

1911 births
1995 deaths
20th-century classical composers
Chinese classical composers
Chinese classical pianists
People's Republic of China composers
Pupils of Arthur Honegger
Musicians from Suzhou
People from Kunshan
20th-century classical pianists